Omiodes analis is a moth in the family Crambidae. It was described by Snellen in 1880. It is found in India, China, Borneo and Taiwan.

References

Moths described in 1880
analis